The Women's 1500 metres race of the 2015 World Single Distance Speed Skating Championships was held on 15 February 2015.

Results
The race was started at 13:58.

References

Women's 1500 metres
World